M&H Company  (full legal name: M&H Company d.o.o. Sarajevo) is one of the leading Cable Television and Broadband Internet service provider in Bosnia and Herzegovina. It is headquartered in Sarajevo. 
The M&H Company group members are HS Kablovska televizija and HKBnet. The main activity of M&H Company group is the provision of cable television, digital television, Broadband Internet|cable internet access and fixed telephony in the following Bosnian cities: Sarajevo, Kakanj, Zenica and Travnik.

Cable TV Channel line-up
M&H Company currently (September 2013) offers 64 TV channels via cable television in Sarajevo.

References

External links
 Official website of M&H Company

Companies based in Sarajevo
Communications in Bosnia and Herzegovina
Internet service providers of Bosnia and Herzegovina
Cable television companies
Internet service providers
Brands of Bosnia and Herzegovina